Siiri Saimi Angerkoski (born Pelkonen, later Palmu; 21 August 1902  – 28 March 1971) was a Finnish actress who had a long career on stage, but is especially known for her film roles. With 98 credits, she has done more roles in Finnish films than any other actor or actress. Her best known comedic role is Justiina Puupää in Pekka and Pätkä films, but she won her two Jussi Awards for dramatic roles in Anna Liisa (1945) and Aliisa (1971), the latter posthumously.

Personal life
Angerkoski was married to actor Kaarlo Angerkoski (1906–1939) from 1933 until his death. They had one daughter.

Selected filmography
Kaikki rakastavat (1935)
Suomisen perhe (1941)
Uuteen elämään (1942)
Sylvi (1944)
Vain sinulle (1945)
Anna Liisa (1945)
Onnen-Pekka (1948)
Professori Masa  (1950)
Rovaniemen markkinoilla (1951)
We're Coming Back (1953)
Pekka Puupää (1953)
Kankkulan kaivolla (1960)
Kesyttömät veljekset (1969)

References

External links

1902 births
1971 deaths
Actors from Oulu
People from Oulu Province (Grand Duchy of Finland)
Finnish film actresses
20th-century Finnish actresses